This is a list of monuments in Sindhuli District, Nepal as officially recognized by and available through the website of the Department of Archaeology, Nepal. Sindhuli is a district of Bagmati Province and is located in central Nepal. Hindu temples are the main attraction of this district.

List of monuments

|}

See also 
 List of monuments in Bagmati Province
 List of monuments in Nepal

References 

Sindhuli